{{Infobox Boxingmatch
| image = 
| fight date = July 16, 2005
| Fight Name = Next in Line
| location = MGM Grand Garden Arena, Paradise, Nevada, U.S.
| fighter1 = Bernard Hopkins
| nickname1 = The Executioner
| record1 = 46–2–1–1 (32 KO)
| height1 = 6 ft 1 in
|style1 = Orthodox
| weight1 = 160 lb
| hometown1 = Philadelphia, Pennsylvania, U.S.
| recognition1 = WBA (Undisputed), WBC, IBF, WBO, and The Ring middleweight champion[[The Ring (magazine)|The Ring]] No. 1 ranked pound-for-pound fighter
| fighter2 = Jermain Taylor
| nickname2 = Bad Intentions
| record2 = 23–0 (17 KO)
| height2 = 6 ft 1 in
| weight2 = 160 lb
| style2 = Orthodox
| hometown2 = Little Rock, Arkansas, U.S.
| recognition2 = 
| titles = WBA (Undisputed), WBC, IBF, WBO, and The Ring middleweight titles
| result= Taylor wins via 12-round split decision (112–116, 115–113, 115–113)
}}

Bernard Hopkins vs. Jermain Taylor, billed as Next in Line'', was a professional boxing match contested on July 16, 2005 for the WBA (Undisputed), WBC, IBF, WBO, and The Ring middleweight championships.

Taylor
2005 in boxing
Boxing in Las Vegas
2005 in sports in Nevada
July 2005 sports events in the United States
MGM Grand Garden Arena